Hussein Ali Jasim Al Saedi (born 29 November 1996) is an Iraqi professional footballer who plays for Tunisian Ligue Professionnelle 1 club CS Sfaxien and the Iraq national team. A creative player, he mainly plays as an attacking midfielder but can also perform well as a winger.

Club career

Early career
Hussein was born in Baghdad in 1996 and comes from Sadr City. The player started in the youth system of Al-Quwa Al-Jawiya for their Ishbal or cubs team until he enrolled at the Ammo Baba School. There he was trained by the Habib Jafar, a former Iraq player. Like his mentor, Hussein began his career as a right winger but is seen as more than just a right sided attacker. Hussein has a versatility to his game and has already proven that he can play anywhere in midfield, whether it be in the center, out-wide on either wings or as a playmaker. He went onto play for the Iraqi U-14s and for the Iraqi Schoolboys’ team at the 2013 Arab School Championship in Tunisia where he played three matches in the city of Grombalia and scoring one goal in a 3–0 win over Kuwait.

A gifted footballer in his youth, he was often overlooked by youth coaches because of his height. Standing at a mere 5 ft 3in, he struggled to make the cut ahead of more physically developed players. This could have stalled the careers of many others, according to football writer Hassanin Mubarak but not Hussein, a player that was destined to make it as a footballer. "If you ask him what he fears most about life, he will tell you, the only thing he fears is failure, which is why he gives every inch on the field and is never one to give up or concede defeat." That overwhelming determination to succeed has seen him win both a league and cup winners’ medal by the time he had turned 20 and he was a regular in Iraq's national side.

Al Zawraa
Growing up, Hussein Ali was always seen by his coaches as a gifted footballer and the young Hussein traveled the region, playing football for teams in youth tournaments. At just 12 he was part of a 22-man Iraqi Under-14 squad that participated at the Asian Under-14 Games in Doha where he met and took a memorable photo as a memento with Iraqi captain Younis Mahmoud, then a player at Al-Gharafa. Hussein was one of the youngest players in the squad but eight years later, he was the only member of the side to have made it at the top level in the Iraqi league.

After a spell with Nadi Amana Baghdad's U-17 side, Hussein moved to Al-Zawraa which was where he found his spiritual home. He was a student in the fourth grade of middle school when he joined the club's youth side and the coaches at the club knew they had a real talent on their hands. Hussein came under the supervision of Basim Luaibi and played in a youth championship winning team which included defender Najim Shwan and by the time he had turned seventeen, the club's training staff believed it was the right time for him to move up to the first team.

At the start of the season Hussein had been one of the players promoted by the club's new coach Jamal Ali from Al-Zawraa's youth team and had been designated the No.34 as his squad number. However just two matches into the season, the coach, who had brought him into the first team, was sacked after a humiliating 4–2 defeat to lowly Al-Masafi Al-Wasat. His replacement was a former club favourite and player Emad Mohammed.

Whilst there was talk of financial worries behind the scenes in the club boardroom, further exasperation by the team's stuttering league form, Hussein's path to first team football was blocked by players such as Egyptian professional Mostafa Jalal, Mohammed Saad, Haidar Sabah and Amjad Walid and he slid further down the pecking order when Al-Zawraa signed a Brazilian and a Syrian as they looked to challenge for the league title.

In early 2015 and three months after he had turned eighteen, Hussein Ali was on the fringes of making his first team debut for the White Seagulls and on March 6, 2015, he was finally handed his league debut against Naft Al-Wasat at just 18 years, three months and five days. His team were one-nil down to the Najaf-based oil club when his coach Emad Mohammed instructed him to get  stripped and warmed-up and moments later he was sent on for another substitute, the same player who had replaced injured Jô Santos after only half-an hour of the match. The Brazilian's injury and the club's decision to subsequently terminate his contract by mutual consent, had opened the door for Hussein Ali.

After the 1–0 defeat to Naft Al-Wasat and the postponement of the Iraqi league, Hussein Ali was given his first league start a month later. It came against Karbala at the Al-Shaab Stadium after the White Seagulls had several key players out with long-term injuries including Brazilian Jô Santos and Syrian Ahmed Al-Douni another professional who had his contract terminated. In their absence Hussein played the full 90 minutes and was one of the best performers in the team and became a regular member of the side going into the remaining matches of the season.

The following season, Al-Zawraa appointed Basim Qasim and once more, Hussein, the youngest member of the team, found himself on the bench for the first game of the season. It took a few matches before the teenager won over the coach with his willingness to fight and run his heart out for the team and became a regular fixture for the first team. He had played in every round on Al-Zawraa's road to the Iraq FA Cup final, where they lost 2–0 to Al-Quwa Al-Jawiya.

He was a substitute for the opening two matches of the season but after a 2–2 draw with Naft Al-Janoob, Hussein was given his first start in a 2–1 victory over Samawa and continued in the first team until Match day 10 when it looked as if his season was over.

On November 19, 2015, Al-Zawraa announced the distressing news that the player had struck by a stray bullet near his home in the east of Baghdad, with the medical staff at a local hospital having been able to remove the bullet from his foot!, The technical staff has given the player a limited rest period.

When he returned, the player was in and out of the team for the remainder of the first stage of the 2015–2016 season. The midfielder had been out for three months as he battled back from the injury and returned on February 11, 2016, as a second-half substitute in a 1–0 victory over Nadi Amana Baghdad and made only two further appearances in the first stage of the Iraqi League.

However, by then, Hussein had gained a starting place in team's – developing a blossoming partnership on the right flank with full back and fellow Al-Thawra resident Alaa Mhawi. In the Elite Stage of the Iraqi league, Hussein started in all of the seven matches and scored two goals as the club won a record 13th Iraqi league title. At the end of the season, Hussein was voted the Iraqi League's young player of the season and next came a call up to the Olympic team. The following season, Hussein was instrumental once again as Al Zawraa won the Iraqi FA Cup.

During the 2018 winter transfer window, the player received an offers, from Qatari club Al Ahli SC, but it was rejected by Al Zawraa board of directors, And from Shabab Al-Ahli Dubai in UAE, and Libyan club to play to their teams. However the deal fell through when his agent was unable to complete the transfer, because of his participation in AFC U23 Championship, and he preferred to stay with his team until the end of the season. On 13 May 2018, the Qatari media reported that Al-Sailiya SC is close to signing with Hussein in the summer transfer, but he moved to another club. Hussein was instrumental in win the league title with Al Zawraa. He scored 7 goals and many assist for the club 2017–18.

Qatar SC
On 10 June 2018, Qatar SC announced that the player had signed a contract with team for the 2018–2019 season. On 16 July after the end of the long season, he joined Qatar SC, He was given the number 9 jersey. Hussein didn't rest for three consecutive seasons, because of his continuing participation with the club and national teams. He scored his first and second goal for Qatar SC in the first match in the league against Al-Gharafa on 4 August 2018. With a good start, the player experienced difficulties after changing the trainer and adding a striker unable to request the ball behind the defenders and receive the crossing balls. The entire team underperformed as Qatar SC ended the season in the relegation playoff, in which Hussein scored the winner in order to keep the club in the first division. Hussein Ali and Qatar SC ended the contract by mutual consent.

Return to Al-Zawraa
Hussein Ali returned to Al-Zawraa following his season abroad in Qatar.

Sfaxien
21 August 2021, Hussein joined Tunisian side Sfaxien.

International career

Iraq U-23
Hussein first tournament for the Iraq national U-23 team was the 2018 AFC U-23 Championship qualification. He started in all of the three matches that Iraq played, scoring a goal against Saudi Arabia, in a match that ended in a 2–0 win for Iraq. He was the best player in the group matches. In January the AFC nominated five players to watch and the best young talent from across the continent before 2018 AFC U-23 Championship, he scoring amazing goal for Iraq against Malaysia.

Iraq
On 26 August 2017, Hussein made his International debut against Syria national team in a friendly match ended draw 1–1. He had a breakthrough in the 23rd Arabian Gulf Cup, where he impressed greatly, being named man of the match in all three group stage games. He scored his first goal for Iraq national team in a 2–3 loss over Qatar during 2018 International Friendship Championship.

Career statistics

Club

1 Include League play-off match.

² CAF Confederation Cup

 Assist Goals

International

International goals

Scores and results list Iraq's goal tally first.

Style of play

Hussein Ali has a low center of gravity, like many talented players of his stature, and another thing that is noticeable are his powerful thighs, this makes it almost impossible for taller and more physical defenders to knock him off the ball, the player has incredible stamina and rarely does he exhibit any exhaustion or break a sweat when he comes off at the end of the match and has a versatility to his game and that he can play anywhere in midfield, whether it be in the center, out-wide on either wings or as a playmaker. Iraq's great footballer Ahmed Radhi, who scored Iraq's only goal at a World Cup finals, told a Kuwaiti TV sports program that he was the one player who gets him out of his seat,“like Messi when he gets on the ball for Barcelona and causes havoc in the penalty area.”

Honours

Club
Al-Zawraa
Iraqi Premier League: 2015–16, 2017–18
Iraq FA Cup: 2016–17
Iraqi Super Cup: 2017

CS Sfaxien
Tunisian Cup: 2021–22

lraq
 WAFF Championship runner-up: 2019
 Arabian Gulf Cup: 2023

Individual
2019 WAFF Championship: Top Scorer
2019 WAFF Championship: Best Player

References

External links
 

Iraqi footballers
1996 births
Living people
Association football midfielders
Sportspeople from Baghdad
Al-Zawraa SC players
Qatar SC players
Qatar Stars League players
Iraq international footballers
Iraqi expatriate footballers
Expatriate footballers in Qatar
2019 AFC Asian Cup players